The 2010 NPF Senior Draft is the seventh annual NPF Draft.  It was held February 10, 2010 8:00 PM EST in Kissimmee, FL at the Hermitage Key Resort for the 2010 season.  It was streamed live on the Major League Baseball's website MLB.com.  The first selection was Alabama's Charlotte Morgan, picked by the USSSA Florida Pride.  Athletes are not allowed by the NCAA to sign professional contracts until their collegiate seasons have ended.

2010 NPF Draft
Position key: 
C = Catcher; UT = Utility infielder; INF = Infielder; 1B = First base; 2B =Second base SS = Shortstop; 3B = Third base; OF = Outfielder; RF = Right field; CF = Center field; LF = Left field;  P = Pitcher; RHP = right-handed Pitcher; LHP = left-handed Pitcher; DP =Designated player
Positions are listed as combined for those who can play multiple positions.

Round 1

Round 2

Round 3

Round 4

Round 5

References 

2010 in softball
National Pro Fastpitch drafts